The 1999 PPP Healthcare County Championship was pivotal in the history of the County Championship for two reasons. The first was that it was the 100th officially organised running of the Championship.

The second reason was that for the first time, the decision was made to split the championship into two divisions. The top nine teams would populate the first division the following year with the bottom nine teams going into the second division.

The sponsorship by Britannic Assurance came to an end with PPP (Private Patients Plan) Healthcare taking over and Surrey won the Championship.

Table
12 points for a win
4 points for a draw

References

1999 in English cricket
County Championship seasons